Col. Billy Bibit RAM is a 1994 Philippine biographical action film directed by William Mayo. The film stars Rommel Padilla in the title role. The film is based on the life of the late colonel Billy Bibit.

The film is streaming online on YouTube.

Cast
 Rommel Padilla as Col. Billy Bibit
 Daniel Fernando as Capt. Lapeña
 Paquito Diaz as Hadji Muhran
 Efren Reyes Jr. as Abdul Hassim
 E. R. Ejercito as Salupdin
 Bing Loyzaga as Odette
 Robin Padilla as Col. Gringo Honasan
 Tonton Gutierrez as Tiger Tecson
 Dan Alvaro as Col. Rodolfo Aguinaldo
 Roi Vinzon as Col. Red Kapunan
 Jun Aristorenas as Gen. Gulang
 Dante Rivero as Gen. Custodio
 Lito Legaspi as Ret. Col. Sabello Bibit
 Conrad Poe as Muharet Muktar
 Orestes Ojeda as Bobby Tañada
 Pen Medina as Datu Kiram
 Manjo del Mundo as Col. Rodriguez
 Boy Alano as Informer
 Dexter Doria as Mother of Bibit
 Zandro Zamora as Bobby Barbers
 Alex David as Sgt. Gomez
 Romy Romulo as Mayor Omar Ali
 Nanding Fernandez as Cong. Anao
 Manny Rodriguez as Coun. Rino Antham

References

External links

Full Movie on Viva Films

1994 films
1994 action films
Filipino-language films
Philippine biographical films
Philippine action films
Viva Films films